Navy Weeks are designed to educate Americans on the importance of Naval service, understand the investment they make in their Navy and to increase awareness in cities which might not otherwise see the Navy at work on a regular basis.

History
Navy Weeks are organized around an "anchor event" or large community event such as a state fair or a public holiday celebration. By planning Navy Weeks around or in conjunction with these larger public events, Navy Week participants are able to increase the awareness of a larger number of people from diverse geographic areas in regions all across the United States.

About 20 Navy Weeks are led by the Navy Office of Community Outreach (NAVCO) each year. Cities and towns are selected based on a wide range of criteria with careful consideration given to aspects such as anchor events, Blue Angels air shows, asset availability, city size, demographic make-up, geographic region, relationship building, relationship sustainment and new outreach opportunities.

A typical Navy Week has two main elements:
A regional Navy Band's Top-40 rock group or Jazz ensemble will perform in the selected city at multiple locations.
A Navy Admiral or Flag Officer will speak to civic and educational organizations at various public speaking engagements in the area. Admirals from commands throughout the world volunteer to participate and in many cases he or she has a tie to the community, e.g., he or she attended high school in the area.  The typical speaking venues are rotary club meetings, colleges, TV and news radio shows and other non-profit groups such as Lions Clubs and Project Hope. Speaking topics include:
Our Maritime Strategy and the purpose of our Naval forces.
Effectively using the Navy's budget.
Information on what events are planned for the Navy Week.

Participating in any given Navy Week along with the Flag officer and Navy Band are active-duty and reserve Navy Public Affairs Officers, local civic organizations, as well as local sailors and recruiters from the regional Navy Recruiting District (NRD). In addition, crew members from a namesake ship will participate in the Navy Week (e.g., sailors from the USS Cleveland visit the city of Cleveland during Cleveland Navy Week).

2011 Navy Weeks Schedule

Navy Weeks history
Below are the cities and dates of all prior Navy Weeks from 2005 to 2010. (Lists are in chronological order according to the day started)

See also
Fleet Week

External links
 Official Navy Website
 Navy NewsStand
 Navy Recruiting Command
 2008 Chicago Navy Week Opens at Bud Billiken Parade
 Buffalo Opens Navy Week 2008
 Denver Navy Week Website
 Information on Navy Flight Simulator(.pdf)
 Blue Angels
 Leap Frogs Parachute Team

Civil–military relations
Navy Office of Community Outreach
United States Navy traditions